The 1961 NBA World Championship Series was the championship series of the 1961 NBA Playoffs, which concluded the National Basketball Association (NBA)'s 1960–61 season. The best-of-seven series was played between the Western Conference champion St. Louis Hawks and the Eastern Conference champion Boston Celtics. This was the fourth and final World Championship Series meeting between the two teams.  It was also Celtics' fifth straight trip to the championship series, and they won the series against the Hawks, 4–1.

, this remains the Hawks franchise’s last appearance in the NBA Finals, the second-longest drought behind the Kings franchise who last played in the NBA Finals in 1951.

Series summary

Celtics win series 4–1

Team rosters

Boston Celtics

St. Louis Hawks

See also
 1961 NBA Playoffs
 1960–61 NBA season

Notes

References
 "1960-61 NBA Season Summary", basketball-reference.com. Retrieved March 28, 2014.

External links
 1961 Finals at NBA.com
 1961 NBA Playoffs at Basketball-Reference.com

Finals
National Basketball Association Finals
NBA
NBA
NBA Finals
NBA Finals
NBA Finals
Basketball competitions in Boston
Basketball competitions in St. Louis
1960s in Boston
1960s in St. Louis